The Good Braider is a young adult novel in verse by Terry Farish, published May 1, 2012 by Marshall Cavendish.

Reception 
The Good Braider received starred reviews from School Library Journal and Booklist, as well as positive reviews from Bulletin of the Center for Children's Books and Kirkus. The American Immigration Council called the book "bold and brave."

The book has been discussed in academic journals, including Journal of Children's Literature, NCTE's Talking Points, Journal of Adolescent & Adult Literacy, The ESSE Messenger, and English Journal.

Bank Street College of Education named The Good Braider one of the best children's books of 2013.

References

External links 

 2013 ALSC & YALSA Book Picks: The year’s best titles for children and teens
 25 Kid and YA Books That Lift Up Immigrant Voices
 Hearing the World: Fiction and nonfiction audiobooks from around the globe
 Why Verse? Poetic Novels for Historical Fiction, Displacement Stories, and Struggling Readers

See also 

Novels set in Sudan
Novels set in Maine
Novels set in Cairo
Young adult novels
Verse novels
Marshall Cavendish books
2012 children's books